Raisio is a town and municipality in south-western Finland and an important junction of major roads.

History
The oldest known written records relating to Raisio are from the year 1292, and there is strong evidence of Stone Age settlement in the area, but Raisio did not become a city until 1974. Until the late 20th century, this was an agricultural area. The success of the Raisio Group transformed it into an industrial centre, and triggered a huge increase in population – during the 20th century the population of Raisio grew elevenfold. The town's existence was under threat, as Turku was planning on merging Raisio to it. This changed after Raisio Group became a successful company.

Name
The name Raisio was originally given to its river, Raisionjoki. The earliest form of the river's name is Raisajoki, meaning "marsh/bog river", and etymological evidence of this can be seen in the Estonian word raisnik, meaning "peatland meadow". Another theory behind the etymology of the name Raisio is that it comes from the word raiskio, meaning a forest that's been damaged by poor foresting, because the Raisio landscape was changed due to sloughs and post-glacial rebound after the Ice Age.

Politics
Results of the 2019 Finnish parliamentary election in Raisio:

Social Democratic Party   23.9%
True Finns   22.5%
National Coalition Party   19.2%
Left Alliance   13.2%
Green League   7.2%
Centre Party   6.7%
Christian Democrats   2.1%
Movement Now 1.8%
Swedish People's Party   1.8%

Economy
The town's location on good traffic connections and near the region's capital has contributed greatly to its growth. Its main industries are services, foodstuffs and chemical manufacturing. The largest employer in the town is the Raisio Group, a manufacturer of foodstuffs, animal feed and health products.

Raisio is also home to the Mylly shopping centre, one of the largest in Scandinavia.

The town also has the third IKEA of Finland.

The biggest employers in Raisio:

Points of interest
The town of Raisio has many cultural venues, such as the Friisilä handicrafts center, which offers the visitor a glimpse at traditional Finnish arts and crafts. The cultural center Harkko in the town center comprises an arts museum, an archaeological museum and a theatre. The city library and swimming center Ulpukka are also worth mentioning. In Raisio is also Finland's biggest middle school which is called "Vaisaaren yläkoulu".

The Raisio railway station, located along the Turku–Uusikaupunki railway, was proclaimed a built cultural environment of national significance by the Finnish Heritage Agency.

Notable residents
 Kalervo Kummola (born 1945), Finnish ice hockey executive, businessman, and politician

Twin towns – sister cities
Raisio is twinned with:
  Kingisepp, Russia
 Sigtuna, Sweden
 Csongrád, Hungary
 Elmshorn, Germany

References

External links

Town of Raisio – Official website
Raisio Group
Mylly shopping center

 
Cities and towns in Finland
Populated coastal places in Finland
Populated places established in the 13th century